Anna Mae Wills (born Anna Mae Routledge; March 31, 1982) is a Canadian actress. She is best known for her role as Celeste in the Disney Channel Original Movie 16 Wishes.

Biography
Wills was born in Calgary, Alberta. She graduated from the University of Windsor in 2004 with a BFA.

Career
Wills appeared in CBS's Harper's Island in the recurring role of Kelly Seavers. She was also in Hallmark Hall of Fame's A Dog Named Christmas, starring Bruce Greenwood, and has been in episodes of Life Unexpected, Smallville, Supernatural and Psych.

Her feature film credits include 2012, directed by Roland Emmerich, and I Love You, Beth Cooper.

Filmography

++ - credited as Anna Mae Routledge

References

External links

1982 births
Living people
Actresses from Calgary
Canadian film actresses
Canadian television actresses
University of Windsor alumni